Piip is an Estonian surname. Notable people with the surname include:

Ants Piip (1884–1942), Estonian lawyer, diplomat, and politician
 (1906–1966), Soviet volcanologist

Estonian-language surnames